is a 1995 vertical-scrolling shooter arcade game developed and published by Jaleco. The game is a parody of arcade shooters in a vein similar to the Parodius series. It was followed up with a sequel, Gun Bare! Game Tengoku 2.

An updated port of the Sega Saturn version for PlayStation 4 and Microsoft Windows, titled Game Tengoku CruisnMix, was released on November 29, 2017. The official English localization was released on November 29, 2018. A port for Nintendo Switch was released in Japan on December 19, 2019. It was released in North America and Europe on May 28, 2020.

Gameplay

Game Tengoku is a vertical-scrolling shooter similar to games like Parodius (1987). Its plot involves a mad scientist named Genius Yamada harnessing the power of arcade cabinets to take over the Me & You video arcade. The arcade's clerk, Yuki Ito, calls upon the help of various Jaleco protagonists to stop Yamada before he takes over all of the arcades in the world.

The player controls one of these Jaleco characters throughout the game's six stages, as they must destroy moving formations of enemies and avoid collision with them and their projectiles. These characters are pulled from five 1980s arcade games: Exerion (1983), Formation Z (1984), Momoko 120% (1986), Butasan (1987), and Plus Alpha (1989). Each of them possesses their own unique weapon loadout themed to their original game; some feature a faster firing rate while others have more powerful projectiles. Characters also have "superbombs" that clear the screen of enemies when deployed. Destroying red cubical enemies dispenses a power-up capsule that increases the strength of the player's weapons, as well as two small ships known as "options" that provide additional firepower. Options take the form of one of the player characters and their weapons correspond to the character they are based on. The Sega Saturn version features several additions to the game, including a character from Field Combat (1985), an "Arrange" mode that implements story-driven cutscenes, and a remixed soundtrack.

Reception

In Japan, Game Machine listed Game Tengoku in their February 1, 1996 issue as being the sixteenth most-popular arcade game at the time.

Notes

References

External links
 
 Game Tengoku at Killer List of Videogames

1995 video games
Arcade video games
City Connection franchises
Crossover video games
Jaleco games
Parody video games
Sega Saturn games
Vertically scrolling shooters
Video games about video games
Video games developed in Japan